Kadaladi taluk is a taluk of Ramanathapuram district of the Indian state of Tamil Nadu. The headquarters of the taluk is the town of Kadaladi.

Demographics
According to the 2011 census, the taluk of Kadaladi had a population of 144,386 with 73,001  males and 71,385 females. There were 978 women for every 1000 men. The taluk had a literacy rate of 69.59. Child population in the age group below 6 was 7,314 Males and 6,945 Females.

Revenue Villages under Kadaladi Taluk 
There are a total of 43 revenue villages under Kadaladi Taluk. 
A.nedunkulam
A.usilankulam
Alavankulam
Appanur
Avathandai
Iruveli
K.veppankulam
Kadaladi
Kadugusandai
Kannirajapuram
Keelakidaram
Keelaselvanur
Keerandai
Kokkarasankottai
Kondunallanpatti
Kurichikulam
Kuthiraimozhi
M.karisalkulam
Marandai
Mariyur	
Meenangudi
Melakidaram
Melaselvanur
Mookkaiyur
Narippaiyur
Orivayal
Oruvanendal
Panivasal
Peilkulam
Periyakulam
Pooppandiyapuram
Pramanankulam
Punavasal
S.tharaikudi
S.vagaikulam
Sayalkudi
Sikkal
Sippikulam
Siraikulam
T.karisalkulam
T.m.kottai
T.veppankulam
Thanichiyam
Valinokkam

References 

Taluks of Ramanathapuram district